Heinrich Ernst Göring (31 October 1839 – 7 December 1913) was a German jurist and diplomat who served as colonial governor of German South West Africa. He was the father of five children including Hermann Göring, the Nazi leader and commander of the Luftwaffe (German Air Force).

Personal life

Göring was born in Emmerich am Rhein. He was the son of Wilhelm Göring (1791–1874), and his wife, Caroline Maria de Nerée (1815–1886). Göring married, secondly, to Franziska Tiefenbrunn: the marriage produced five recorded children:

 Karl-Ernst Göring (born 1885 in Rosenheim; died 1932 in Hanover), jurist
 Olga Therese Sophie Göring (born 1889 in Walvis Bay; died 1970)
 Paula Elisabeth Rosa Göring (1890–1960)
 Hermann Göring (born 1893 in Rosenheim; died 1946 in Nuremberg), German politician, military leader, and leading member of the Nazi Party (NSDAP)
 Albert Göring (born 1895 in Friedenau, Berlin; died 1966 in Munich), businessman

Career
After a career as a provincial judge, the Dutch-speaking Göring was appointed Imperial Commissioner of German South West Africa in 1885, the first German imperial commissioner, after Otto von Bismarck was forced into creating a state-financed colonial administration to support his country's fledgling Protectorate of South West Africa.

Göring's first action was to gain a 'protection treaty' with the leading Herero chief, Maharero. The treaty of protection wasn't worth the paper it was written on, as Göring was in no position to offer assistance. Repeated, successful armed attacks by Witbooi's Nama clan proved the point. The treaty was violated a few years later anyway by Maharero, who also expelled Göring from Hereroland: the behaviour of the Germans had become too much and, worst of all, Göring had — perhaps unwittingly — extended his house on top of a Herero ancestral graveyard. The gold rush was a hoax, however, for the purported gold deposits were nothing apart from the remains of gold pieces fired at a rock face. The identity of the hoaxer remains a mystery, but suspicion falls on Göring making a last-ditch, desperate attempt to bring investment into the protectorate, and thus save his failing mission.

The expected vast gold deposits started a gold rush of German settlers and investors into South West Africa, whose behaviour further alienated the Herero. This eventually led to the Herero and Namaqua genocide. Herero skulls were eventually used by the Kaiser Wilhelm Institute of Anthropology, Human Heredity, and Eugenics, pursuing a policy of eugenics.

Notes

Bibliography

1839 births
1913 deaths
People from Kleve (district)
People from the Rhine Province
Heinrich Ernst
Colonial people in German South West Africa
German diplomats
Jurists from North Rhine-Westphalia
University of Bonn alumni
Prussian Army personnel
People of the Austro-Prussian War
German military personnel of the Franco-Prussian War